John Vincent Martino (Atlantic City, 3 August 1911 - Miami Beach, 3 August 1975) was an American casino security systems technician who spent 40 months in jail in Havana and published the book I Was Castro's Prisoner (1963), ghostwritten by Nathaniel Weyl.

Martino went to Havana in 1958 for the opening of the Hotel Deauville, owned by mobster Santo Trafficante Jr., to install security systems for the casino. He was arrested in 1959 on charges of smuggling money. His 16-year-old son was also held at the same time but released after four days. Martino was held at both Castillo de Atarés and El Principe prisons. His release and return to Miami in October 1962 gained him some status among anti-Castro exiles.

References

20th-century American people
1911 births
1975 deaths
American expatriates in Cuba